Helligvær is an island group in the Vestfjorden in Bodø Municipality in Nordland county, Norway.

There are about 365 islands, islets, and skerries in the group.  They are all low and grassy with no trees.  There are five inhabited islands in the group: Sørvær (most populous), Brønnøya, Storsørøya, Vetterøya, and Vokkøya (the largest). The islanders live in small fishing villages around the island group.  There were about 106 inhabitants in 2017. Helligvær Church is located on the island of Storsørøya and Grytøy Lighthouse is located on the island of Grytøy in the southern part of the island group.

See also
List of islands of Norway

References

External links
Article from 14 March 2021. NRK

Bodø
Islands of Nordland